Statistics of Chinese Taipei National Football League in the 1992 season.

Overview
Taipower won the championship.

References
RSSSF

Chinese Taipei National Football League seasons
1
Taipei
Taipei